= Public bathroom =

Public bathroom may refer to:

- Public toilet
- Public bathing
